Jeppo is a former municipality of Finland, now a village of Nykarleby. The population is about 1,100; 82% of whom are Swedish-speaking.

KWH Mirka has a factory there that produces coated and non-woven abrasives.

The village is twinned with the Emmaboda Municipality, Sweden.

History
The original settlement was known as Epu. In 1548 there were 189 inhabitants including 26 farmers. The church was opened in 1861. In 1970, 84.5% of inhabitants were Swedish-speaking and 15.4% Finnish-speaking, thus the former municipality was bilingual. That municipality merged into Nykarleby in 1975.

References

Populated places disestablished in 1975
Former municipalities of Finland
Villages in Finland
Nykarleby